Serge Mukoko Tomombe (born 16 January 1996) is a Congolese professional footballer who plays as a midfielder for TP Mazembe. He represents the DR Congo national team.

Playing career
Mukoko began his playing career with the Congolese clubs Renaissance and Vita Club. He moved to Tanzania with Young Africans on 18 August 2020.

International career
Amale debuted with the DR Congo in a 3–2 friendly loss to Rwanda on 18 September 2019.

References

External links
NFT Profile
FDB Profile
TP Mazembe Profile

1996 births
Living people
Democratic Republic of the Congo footballers
Democratic Republic of the Congo international footballers
Association football midfielders
AS Vita Club players
Linafoot players
Botola players
TP Mazembe players
Democratic Republic of the Congo expatriate footballers
Democratic Republic of the Congo expatriate sportspeople in Tanzania
Expatriate footballers in Tanzania